Klub Piłkarski Starogard Gdański is a Polish football team from Starogard Gdański, Poland.

History

The club were founded in 2008, joining the B Klasa for the 2008–09 season. In their first season the club won promotion by winning their league. They followed their initial success with two more consecutive promotions going from the eighth tier to the fifth tier in three seasons. In 2017 the club were promoted to the III liga, managing to stay in the league finishing comfortably in 9th. In the 2017–18 season, Starogard Gdański won the regional, Pomeranian Voivodeship Polish Cup, meaning the club would be entered into the national cup the following season. Starogard Gdański had their greatest national success the following season in 2018–19, making a name for themselves in the Polish Cup. They won their first game against Górnik Łęczna 1–0 to advance to the round of 32, eventually being knocked out of the competition to I liga side Puszcza Niepołomice 3–1.

Honours

Polish Cup: Round of 32 (2018–19)
III liga: 9th place (highest finish)
Pomeranian Voivodeship Polish Cup: 2017–18

Seasons

†Season ongoing.

References 

Association football clubs established in 2008
2008 establishments in Poland
Football clubs in Pomeranian Voivodeship